The Alliance Premier League season of 1982–83 was the fourth season of the Alliance Premier League.

New teams in the league this season
 Bangor City (promoted 1981–82)
 Nuneaton Borough (promoted 1981–82)
 Wealdstone (promoted 1981–82)

Final table

Results

Promotion and relegation

Promoted
 Gateshead (from the Northern Premier League)
 Kidderminster Harriers (from the Southern Premier League)

Relegated
 Barrow (to the Northern Premier League)
 Stafford Rangers (to the Northern Premier League)

Election to the Football League
This year Enfield, the winners of the Alliance Premier League, could not apply for election because they did not meet Football League requirements, so 2nd placed Maidstone United won the right to apply for election to the Football League to replace one of the four bottom sides in the 1982–83 Football League Fourth Division. The vote went as follows:

As a result of this, Maidstone United did not gain membership of the Football League.

References

External links
 1982–83 Conference National Results
 Re-election Results – The Division Four final league table, including the results of the re-election vote.

National League (English football) seasons
5